Andrew Hutchinson is an Australian writer, from Melbourne, who was born in 1979.

Hutchinson's first novel Rohypnol was published in 2007. It won the Victorian Premier's Literary Award for best unpublished manuscript. He was a guest at the 2007 Melbourne Writers Festival. Christos Tsiolkas was Hutchinson's mentor in the writing of his novel. The novel was published by Vintage in 2007. Hutchinson's second novel One was released in April 2018.

Awards and nominations
2006: Victorian Premier's Literary Award for best unpublished manuscript for Rohypnol
2019: ACT Book of the Year award shortlisted for One

Bibliography

Novels
 Rohypnol (Vintage Books, 2007)
 One (Vintage Books, 2018)

External links
Author website - twenty six

Notes

21st-century Australian novelists
Australian male novelists
People from Canberra
Writers from Melbourne
1979 births
Living people
21st-century Australian male writers